The Headquarters Historic District of Glacier National Park comprises the administrative and housing buildings near West Glacier, Montana on the west side of the park.  The area contains a mixture of styles, ranging from National Park Service Rustic to more modern structures built immediately after World War II.

Many of the buildings were built by labor from the Works Progress Administration and the Civilian Conservation Corps. Post-World War II development consists primarily of housing developed under the Mission 66 initiative. Significant buildings in the National Park Service Rustic style include the Superintendent's Residence (1923), the original Administration Building (1923), and a number of residences. Shared facilities included a messhall, bunkhouses and utility buildings.

References

Civilian Conservation Corps in Montana
Park buildings and structures on the National Register of Historic Places in Montana
National Park Service rustic in Montana
Works Progress Administration in Montana
Historic districts on the National Register of Historic Places in Montana
National Register of Historic Places in Flathead County, Montana
National Register of Historic Places in Glacier National Park
Mission 66
1923 establishments in Montana
Government buildings completed in 1923